War tax due stamp is a kind of war tax and postage due stamps that was used for mail when the war tax has not been paid by the sender. They were issued in Romania between 1915 and 1921.

During war the sender of a letter paid a war tax. Then they placed a war tax stamp on the letter showing the tax was paid. If the sender did not do that, a war tax due stamp was applied by the postal service. When the letter was delivered the person receiving the letter paid double the normal rate.

See also 
 Postage due
 Postage stamps and postal history of Romania
 War tax stamp

References 

Postage stamps
Postal history
Revenue stamps
Philatelic terminology
World War I
20th century in Romania
Philately of Romania
1915 introductions
Military economics